Anita Lochner is a German film and television actress.

Selected filmography
 Deep End (1970)
 Tears of Blood (1972)
  (1974, TV film)
  (1976)
 Die Dämonen (1977, TV miniseries)
 The Black Forest Clinic (1987–1988, TV series, 4 episodes)
 Der Landarzt (1992, TV series, 4 episodes)

References

Bibliography
 Goble, Alan. The Complete Index to Literary Sources in Film. Walter de Gruyter, 1999.

External links

1950 births
Living people
German film actresses
German television actresses